James Garth Marshall (20 February 1802 – 22 October 1873) was an English Liberal Party politician, the Member of Parliament for Leeds (1847–1852).

He was the third son of the wealthy industrialist John Marshall who introduced major innovations in flax spinning and built the celebrated Marshall's Mill and Temple Works in Leeds, West Yorkshire.  His eldest brother William was MP for Beverley,  Carlisle and East Cumberland and his next eldest brother, John, was an earlier MP for Leeds.  The fourth brother, Henry Cowper, was Mayor of Leeds in 1842–1843.

Marshall bought the Monk Coniston estate, near Coniston, Cumbria, from the Knott family in 1835. He later created the celebrated landscape of Tarn Hows by constructing a dam to merge three existing small tarns into the present body of water, at the same time supplying water power to his sawmill in Yewdale.  The estate was later bought by Beatrix Potter and eventually passed to the National Trust.

In 1860-61 he served as High Sheriff of Yorkshire

James Garth Marshall wrote a pamphlet entitled Minorities and Majorities; Their Relative Rights. A Letter to Lord John Russell, M.P. on Parliamentary Reform.

References

External links 
 
 Archival material at 

1802 births
1873 deaths
UK MPs 1847–1852
Members of the Parliament of the United Kingdom for English constituencies
Politicians from Leeds
High Sheriffs of Yorkshire